The following is a list of notable events and releases of the year 1951 in Norwegian music.

Events

 Unknown date
 Frank Meidell Falch was assigned as the first director of the Bergen International Festival (1951–1956).
 The Big Chief Jazz Band was established in Oslo.
 Egil Monn-Iversen and Sølvi Wang was married.

Deaths

 April
 6 – Halfdan Cleve, composer (born 1879).

 August
 10 – Gunnar Gjerstrøm, composer and organist (born 1891).

Births

 January
 14 – Tove Karoline Knutsen, jazz singer, composer, and politician.

 March
 31 – Bodvar Moe, composer, bassist and music teacher.

 May
 7 – Ragnar Sør Olsen, singer and songwriter.

 June
 9 – Geir Bøhren, drummer and film score composer.
 24 – Willy Bakken, guitarist and popular culture writer (died 2010).

 November
 15 – Gerd Gudding, fiddler, bass guitarist, and singer (died 2015).
 19 – Per Tveit, pianist and composer (died 2012)
 26 – Terje Nilsen, singer and songwriter.

 December
 8 – Jan Eggum, folk singer and songwriter.
 10 – Ellen Nikolaysen, singer and actress.
 20 – Brynjulf Blix, jazz pianist.

 December
 12 – Erik Hillestad, record producer.

See also
 1951 in Norway
 Music of Norway

References

 
Norwegian music
Norwegian
Music
1950s in Norwegian music